Milan Township is one of the nine townships of Erie County, Ohio, United States. It is part of the Sandusky, Ohio metropolitan statistical area, which is also the county seat of Erie County. As of the 2010 census 3,606 people lived in the township, 2,602 of whom lived in its unincorporated portions.

Geography
Located in the southern part of the county, it borders the following townships:
Huron Township - north
Berlin Township - east
Townsend Township, Huron County - southeast corner
Norwalk Township, Huron County - south
Ridgefield Township, Huron County - southwest corner
Oxford Township - west
Perkins Township - northwest corner
The village of Milan is located in southern Milan Township, and the unincorporated community of Avery (formerly 'Spears Corners'), formerly the center of the township's life, lies in the township's west.

Name and history

Milan Township was originally established about 1808 as "Avery Township". It was shortly later combined with Huron Township for civil and judicial district purposes; and it became Milan Township by 1821. The present site of Avery (centrally located within this township)  was formerly named 'Spears Corners".

Government
The township is governed by a three-member board of trustees, who are elected in November of odd-numbered years to a four-year term beginning on the following January 1. Two are elected in the year after the presidential election and one is elected in the year before it. There is also an elected township fiscal officer, who serves a four-year term beginning on April 1 of the year after the election, which is held in November of the year before the presidential election. Vacancies in the fiscal officership or on the board of trustees are filled by the remaining trustees.

References

External links
Township website
County website

Townships in Erie County, Ohio
Townships in Ohio